Regatta ferry wharf is located on the northern side of the Brisbane River serving the Brisbane suburb of Toowong in Queensland, Australia. It is served by RiverCity Ferries' CityCat services.

History
Regatta wharf opened on 4 July 2003, with the Regatta Hotel contributing $1 million and the Brisbane City Council $500,000 to its construction.

The wharf sustained damage during the January 2011 Brisbane floods. Initially repair work was expected to take up to 18 months, but a survey by engineers showed that the timber access boardwalk, concrete waiting area and steel roof were intact, along with the mooring piles. The floating pontoon was full of water (due to overtopping into the access hatches on the deck), but was still connected to the mooring piles down on the river bed, and was recovered and refloated. A new aluminium gangway was fabricated, and the wharf reopened on 18 April 2011, three months after the flood event.

In October 2014, the wharf closed for an upgrade. The current terminal opened on 25 March 2015.

References

External links

Ferry wharves in Brisbane
Toowong
Transport infrastructure completed in 2003
2003 establishments in Australia